Hans Gabriel Nissen Buck (2 May 1848 – 21 May 1924) was a Norwegian physician and politician for the Conservative Party.

He was born at Inderøy in Nord-Trøndelag, Norway as the son of captain Jørgen Mandix Buck (1814–1878) and his wife Fredrikke Gebhardine Nissen (1822–1902). He enrolled as a student in 1867 and graduated as cand.med. in 1874. He first opened his own physician's office in Fredrikstad, but then worked as municipal physician in Stor-Elvdal, in Sparbu, Stod and Egge from 1878, in Undal from 1885, in Trondenes from 1895 and in Levanger from 1906. In 1912 he was appointed county physician of Nordre Trondhjems amt.

Where he lived, he became involved in politics. He became mayor of Harstad in 1904. He was deputy mayor of Levanger in 1910, 1911 and 1915, and mayor in 1912, 1913 and 1914. He served as a deputy representative to the Parliament of Norway during the term 1916–1918. From 1922 to 1924 he was burgomaster of Levanger.

References

1848 births
1924 deaths
Deputy members of the Storting
Conservative Party (Norway) politicians
Mayors of places in Troms
Mayors of places in Nord-Trøndelag
Norwegian general practitioners